Jacqueline Alduy (20 March 192415 March 2016) was a French politician. She was the mayor of Amélie-les-Bains-Palalda for 42 years, from 1959 to March 2001. She was the mother of Jean-Paul Alduy, mayor of Perpignan, and the wife of Paul Alduy, who was also mayor of Perpignan from 1959 to 1993.

Roles in the Senate 
 Senator for Pyrénées-Orientales (19821983)
 Member of the commission for cultural affairs

Earlier roles 
 General Council of Pyrénées-Orientales (19672001)
 Mayor of Amélie-les-Bains from 1959 to 2001

External links 
 Her webpage on the Senate website

References 

1924 births
2016 deaths
20th-century French women politicians
21st-century French women politicians
French Senators of the Fifth Republic
Women members of the Senate (France)
Mayors of places in Occitania (administrative region)
People from Hanoi
People from Pyrénées-Orientales
People of French Indochina
Politicians of the French Fifth Republic
Union for French Democracy politicians
Women mayors of places in France
Senators of Pyrénées-Orientales